Denise Vasi (born March 1, 1983) is an American fashion model and actress. She is best known for her roles as Randi Hubbard on ABC's soap opera All My Children (2008–2011) and Raquel on Single Ladies (2011-2015).

Early life
Denise Vasi was born on March 1, 1983, in New York City. Denise and her two younger brothers were raised in Brooklyn. She is of Puerto Rican, Dominican and Greek heritage. She attended John Dewey High School and Long Island University where she studied Business.

Career

Acting 
Vasi appeared in ABC's soap opera All My Children as Randi Morgan from 2008 to 2011. She had guest roles on several television shows such as Law and Order: Criminal Intent, White Collar, How to Make It in America and The Protector. Her film roles include The Good Guy (2009), When in Rome (2010), What's Your Number? (2011) and Magic Mike (2012). In 2012, she joined the second season of VH1's comedy-drama series Single Ladies in a new lead role. She portrayed businesswoman Raquel Lancaster for two seasons.

She also featured in rapper Common's music video for Go! and How Do I Breathe by singer Mario.

Modeling
Vasi signed to Ford Models at the age of 12. She is represented by Next Models and has featured in on-camera and print campaigns for brands including Olay, Dove, Bobbi Brown, Nexxus, Urban Decay, Avon, Sharp, Lay's, Target, Fiorucci, Maria Barros, Dollhouse, American Eagle, Old Navy, Republic and Frederick's of Hollywood.

She has appeared in magazine editorials for Marie Claire, Elle and GQ Italia.

Personal life
On October 12, 2013, Vasi married director Anthony Mandler in Santa Ynez, California. In February 2015, Vasi gave birth to their daughter, Lennox, during an at home birth.
On June 28, 2019, she gave birth to a baby boy, also during an at home birth.

Filmography

References

External links 
 

Female models from New York (state)
American people of Dominican Republic descent
American people of Greek descent
American soap opera actresses
Hispanic and Latino American actresses
Living people
Long Island University alumni
People from Brooklyn
Actresses from Los Angeles
Actresses from New York City
1983 births
Models from New York City
21st-century American women